Chenopodium opulifolium, the seaport goosefoot, is a species of annual herb in the family Amaranthaceae (pigweeds). They have a self-supporting growth form. They are associated with freshwater habitat and have simple, broad leaves. Individuals can grow to 67 cm tall.

Sources

References 

opulifolium
Flora of Malta